KDBS (1410 AM, ESPN Alexandria) is an American radio station broadcasting a sports format. The station is licensed by the Federal Communications Commission (FCC) to serve the community of Alexandria, Louisiana. The station is licensed to and operated by Cenla Broadcasting.  KDBS' studios and transmitter are located separately in Alexandria.

History
On February 1, 1988, the callsign was changed to KRRV with the callsign changing on March 15, 1996, back to the callsign of KDBS.

The station aired ESPN sports radio as 1410 ESPN Sports Radio while owned by Clear Channel.  The format was changed to an oldies-based format when the station was acquired by Cenla Broadcasting in November 2006.

In September 2008, Cenla Broadcasting changed the KDBS format back to sports as ESPN 1410.

KDBS was bought by a local attorney named Irving Ward-Steinman with businessman John Lazarone in 1954. It became known as the local rock station in the 60s and 70s before switching formats as noted above.

References

External links

Radio stations in Louisiana
Oldies radio stations in the United States
Mass media in Alexandria, Louisiana